The following is a timeline of the history of the city of Boulder, Colorado, USA.

19th century
 1858
 October 17 - A group of gold prospectors from Fort St. Vrain 30 mi. to the east camp in Red Rocks on Boulder Creek in modern-day Settler's Park at the mouth of Boulder Canyon. This was in Arapaho territory, near the camp of Southern Arapaho chief Chief Niwot (Left Hand) (1825–64) in Valmont Butte. Chief Niwot rode to their camp to warn them to leave, but changed his mind after being given food and liquor. He welcomed the visitors, but not before uttering the Curse of the Boulder Valley: "People seeing the beauty of this valley will want to stay, and their staying will be the undoing of the beauty."
 1859
 January 15 - gold is discovered in Gold Hill, Colorado above Left Hand Canyon in NW Boulder.
 February 10 - the Boulder City Town Company is formed, and the town laid out into 4,044 lots, offered for $1,000 each.
 1861
 February 28 - the Territory of Colorado is created by the U.S. Congress, causing Boulder to no longer be part of Nebraska Territory.
 November 7 - legislation is passed making way for the state university to be located in Boulder. 
 1869 - Boulder County News begins publication.
 1870
Denver and Boulder Valley Railroad begins operating.
 Population: 323
 1871
 November 4 - town incorporated in violation of the Treaty of Fort Laramie.
 1873 - Railroad begins operating.
 1875
 September 20 - the first cornerstone is laid for the first building (Old Main Building) on the University of Colorado campus.
 Colorado Banner newspaper begins publication.
 Boulder High School established.
 1876
 August 1 - Boulder becomes part of new State of Colorado.
 1877 - September 5 - The University of Colorado at Boulder officially opens.
 1878 - 
The first mayor, Jacob Ellison, is elected for a two-month term.
January - Mary Rippon, first female professor at the University of Colorado, joined the faculty.
 1880 - The town passes the 3,000 population mark, making it eligible for incorporation.
 1882
 April 3 - Boulder is incorporated as a 2nd class town, and later that month a new town hall is completed in time for the first meeting of the city council.
 1883
 The first courthouse is built.
 The University of Colorado Medical School opens.
 1885 - Denver, Marshall and Boulder Railway begins operating.
 1890
 Boulder Railroad Depot built.
 Boulder Camera begins publication.
 Population: 3,300.
 1891 - Feeny Opera House active (approximate date).
 1892
 Highland School built.
 University of Colorado Law School established.
 1893 - Philharmonic Club formed.
 1895 - Crockett Ricketts elected mayor.
 1896 - Colorado Sanitarium in business.
 1898
 Chautauqua Auditorium built.
 Colorado & Southern Railway in operation.
 Boulder Citizen's Band established, now the Boulder Concert Band
 1900 
 Colorado Chautauqua established.
 Population: 6,150.

20th century

1900s-1940s
 1902
 Boulder Oil Field well begins operation.
 University of Colorado Museum of Natural History founded.
 1906
 Curran Opera House opens.
 University of Colorado College of Commerce established.
 1907
 Boulder adopts an anti-saloon ordinance.
 Carnegie Library built.
 1909
 Denver, Boulder and Western Railroad begins operating.
 Hotel Boulderado opens.
 1910 - Population: 9,539.
 1916 
Statewide prohibition starts in Colorado, ending with the repeal of national prohibition in 1933.
Florence Molloy and Mabel MacLeay start a taxi service in Boulder.
1918 - Lucile Buchanan is first black female graduate from University of Colorado Boulder.
 1923 - Macky Auditorium opens.
 1924 - Colorado Stadium opens.
 1926 - Rialto Theatre built.
 1929 - Denver Municipal Airport begins operating.
 1932 - The courthouse burns down, and is rebuilt in 1934.
 1937 - Balch Fieldhouse (arena) opened.
 1941 - Civic Symphony Orchestra founded.
 1942 - US Navy School of Oriental Languages moves from California to Boulder and begins training recruits to the US Navy and the Marine Corps in Japanese.
 1944 - Boulder Historical Society established.
 1947 - KBOL radio begins broadcasting.
 1948
 Andrews Arboretum established.
 Conference on World Affairs begins at the University of Colorado.
 1949 - Sommers–Bausch Observatory built.

1950s-1990s
 1950
 Population: 19,999.
 1952
 U.S. National Bureau of Standards-Atomic Energy Commission Cryogenic Engineering Laboratory in operation.
 Denver-Boulder Turnpike opens.
 1953 - Colorado Daily in publication.
 1954 - September: U.S. National Bureau of Standards (now known as National Institute of Standards and Technology) facility dedicated.
 1955 – Denver Regional Council of Governments formed.
1956 - Ball Aerospace & Technologies Corp. (commonly Ball Aerospace), opens.
 1958
 Boulder Philharmonic Orchestra founded.
 Colorado Shakespeare Festival begins.
 1963 - Crossroads Mall in business.
 1966 - Attention Homes opens its first home on 14th St.
 1967 - U.S. National Center for Atmospheric Research Mesa Laboratory built.
 1969 - Regional Transportation District (public transit system) organized.
 1970
 City "comprehensive plan" created.
 Paladin Press in business.
 1971 
Boulder Arts and Crafts Cooperative founded.
Penfield Tate, Boulder's first and only black mayor, elected to Boulder City Council.
 1972 - Historic Boulder, Inc. formed.
 1973 - Vajradhatu headquartered in Boulder.
 1974 - Naropa Institute and Jack Kerouac School of Disembodied Poetics established.
1974 - a series of bombings kill six Chicano activists (Los Seis de Boulder).
 1975 
KBVL radio begins broadcasting.
March 26 - Boulder County Clerk Clela Rorex issued first same-sex marriage license in U.S.
 1976
 Colorado Music Festival begins.
 Residential-growth management ordinance approved.
 1977
 Pearl Street Mall constructed.
 KBCO begins broadcasting.
 1978
 Boulder Magazine begins publication.
 Community radio station KGNU begins broadcasting
 1979
 Colorado University Events Center (arena) opens.
 Bolder Boulder 10K footrace begins.
 1980 - Kinetics Conveyance Race begins.<ref>[http://www.denverpost.com/2010/01/15/kinetics-leaving-boulder-for-longmont/ Denver Post', January 15, 2010]</ref>
 1983 - January 1: Polar Bear Plunge begins.
 1986
 Sister city relationship established with Lhasa, Tibet.
 1987
 Farmer's Market opens.
 Sister city relationship activated with Dushanbe, Tajikistan.
 1988 - Colorado MahlerFest begins.
 1989 - Rocky Mountain Spiritual Emergence Network Times begins publication.
 1990 - Radio Reading Service of the Rockies founded.
 1991
 Culinary School of the Rockies founded.
 eTown (radio program) begins broadcasting.
 1993
 Mountain Sun pub in business.
 Boulder Weekly begins publication.
 1994
 Denver International Airport begins operating.
 Sister city relationship established with Yamagata, Japan.
 Boulder Community Network online.
 1996
 Boulder Area Trails Coalition founded.
 Smoking ban enacted.
 Murder of JonBenét Ramsey
 1998
 October 31: Naked Pumpkin Run begins.
 Bob Greenlee becomes mayor.
 Dushanbe Tea House opens.
 Bent Lens Cinema founded.
 2000
 Sister city relationship established with Ciudad Mante, Mexico.
 Moondance Film Festival begins.

21st century

 2002 — Spot Bouldering Gym in business.
 2004
 Mark Ruzzin becomes mayor.
 Shoot Out 24 Hour Filmmaking Festival begins.
 Boulder Chamber Orchestra founded.
 2005 — Boulder Adventure Film Festival begins.
 2006
 November: Carbon tax approved.
 Twenty Ninth Street shopping center in business.
 Bikes Belong coalition headquartered in Boulder (approximate date).
 2007
 Communikey Festival begins.
 October - Outdoor gear co-op REI opens prototype green store on 28th St.
 2009
 Susan Osborne becomes mayor, succeeded by Matthew Appelbaum.
 Jared Polis becomes Colorado's 2nd congressional district representative.
 Sister city relationship established with Kisumu, Kenya.
 2010 — Population: 97,385.
 Radio station KBCO leaves Boulder for Denver Tech Center studios
Fourmile Canyon fire burns over 400 homes.
 2011
 November: Municipal electric utility approved.
 Boulder Food Rescue active.
 2012 — National Institute of Standards and Technology Precision Measurement Laboratory dedicated.
 2013
 Falling Fruit (urban agriculture map) launched.
 September — record-setting major flood disruption
 2014
Galvanize opens Boulder location
2016
 October — Sen. Bernie Sanders headlines ColoradoCare healthcare-for-all ballot Amendment 69 rally at CU Farrand Field
 Nov. 10 — US36 shut down briefly as anti-Trump protesters march
 2017
 October — OpenStreetMap State of the Map U.S. conference at CU Folsom Field
 2018
 Ban on assault weapons, bump stocks, large magazines
 Boulder History Museum, rebranded as Museum of Boulder, opens in former Masonic Lodge on Broadway
 Radio station KGNU celebrates 40th anniversary, commemorated with Museum of Boulder exhibit
 2021
 March 21 — A mass shooting occurs at a King Soopers supermarket in Boulder.

See also
 History of Boulder, Colorado
 National Register of Historic Places listings in Boulder County, Colorado
 Education in Boulder
 Denver-Aurora-Boulder Combined Statistical Area
 Timeline of Colorado history
 Timelines of other cities in Colorado: Aurora, Colorado Springs, Denver

References

Bibliography

Published in the 19th century
 
 
 
 

Published in the 20th century
 
 
 
 

Published in the 21st century

External links

 Boulder Library. Carnegie Branch Library for Local History
 Photograph Collection
 Digital Public Library of America. Items related to Boulder, Colorado, various dates

 
Boulder
Boulder
boulder